Les Coleman may refer to:

 Lester Coleman, American author
 Les Coleman (politician) (1895–1974), Australian politician